Hendrik Toompere Sr. (17 July 1946, Mustla – 13 October 2008) was an Estonian actor and director.

Toompere was married to actress  Maie Toompere (née Kruusenberg). His children are actors Harriet Toompere and Hendrik Toompere Jr., and his grandson is Hendrik Toompere Jr. Jr.

Since 1963 he worked at Estonian State Puppet Theatre.

Awards:
 2001: Order of the White Star, V class.

Theatrical roles

 1963 "Pärdik ja Kastanipoiss" (role: Kastanipoiss)
 1963 "Pardike Tuttpütt" (role: rabbit)
 1965 "Neli meistrit" (role: wolf)

as a director
 1981 Filipoiu' "Kukkur kahe krossiga" (director)
 1983 Kivistik's "Tänavatund" (director)
 1992 Kitzberg's "Udumäe kuningas" (director)

References

1946 births
2008 deaths
Estonian male stage actors
Estonian theatre directors
Estonian male film actors
Estonian male television actors
20th-century Estonian male actors
21st-century Estonian male actors
Estonian male radio actors
Recipients of the Order of the White Star, 4th Class
People from Saarde Parish
Burials at Metsakalmistu